Macon Township is one of twenty-five townships in Bureau County, Illinois, USA. As of the 2020 census, its population was 196 and it contained 93 housing units. Macon Township changed its name from Jefferson Township in June 1850.

Geography

Unincorporated towns
 Burnett

Cemeteries
The township contains four cemeteries:
 Bunker Hills
 Mount Pleasant
 Walnut Grove
 Wood Family Cemetery

Major highways
  Illinois Route 88

Demographics
As of the 2020 census there were 196 people, 72 households, and 43 families residing in the township. The racial makeup of the township was 95.41% White, 1.02% African American, 0.00% Native American, 0.00% Asian, 0.00% Pacific Islander, 3.06% from other races, and 0.51% from two or more races. Hispanic or Latino of any race were 2.55% of the population.

There were 72 households, out of which 12.50% had children under the age of 18 living with them, 59.72% were married couples living together, none had a female householder with no spouse present, and 40.28% were non-families. 40.30% of all households were made up of individuals, and 4.20% had someone living alone who was 65 years of age or older. The average household size was 1.86 and the average family size was 2.44.

The township's age distribution consisted of 14.2% under the age of 18, none from 18 to 24, 13.4% from 25 to 44, 70.2% from 45 to 64, and 2.2% who were 65 years of age or older. The median age was 55.5 years. For every 100 females, there were 148.1 males. For every 100 females age 18 and over, there were 155.6 males.

The median income for a household in the township was $115,125, and the median income for a family was $115,688. Males had a median income of $79,286 versus $24,375 for females. The per capita income for the township was $49,806. None of the population was below the poverty line.

School districts
 Bradford Community Unit School District 1
 Bureau Valley Community Unit School District 340
 Neponset Community Consolidated District 307

Political districts
 Illinois's 11th congressional district
 State House District 74
 State Senate District 37

References
 
 US Census Bureau 2007 TIGER/Line Shapefiles
 US National Atlas

External links
 City-Data.com
 Illinois State Archives

Townships in Bureau County, Illinois
Populated places established in 1849
Townships in Illinois
1849 establishments in Illinois